A Forest Romance is a 1913 American silent short Western film directed by Frank Montgomery and starring Harry von Meter and Mona Darkfeather.

Cast
 Mona Darkfeather
 Harry von Meter
 James Davis
 Arthur Ortego  
 Harry Schumm
 Jack Messick as Rowland

References

External links
 

1913 films
1913 Western (genre) films
1910s romance films
American black-and-white films
American romance films
American silent short films
Silent American Western (genre) films
1910s American films